Maxime Grésèque (born 18 March 1981) is a French former professional rugby league footballer who is currently head coach of the Limoux Grizzlies.

He has previously played for SM Pia XIII, AS Carcassonne and the Wakefield Trinity Wildcats in the Super League.

Grésèque is the son of former French international and coach, Ivan Grésèque.

Playing career
Greseque played from the bench for France against the touring Australian Kangaroos at the end of the 2005 season, scoring a try.

He was named in the France squad for the 2008 Rugby League World Cup.

He was also named in the French national squad for the 2009 Four Nations, involving the French, English, New Zealand and Australian sides. Grésèque played for France again in the 2010 European Cup.

References

External links
France profile
 Wakefield clinch Greseque signing

1981 births
Living people
AS Carcassonne players
Baroudeurs de Pia XIII players
Featherstone Rovers players
France national rugby league team players
French rugby league players
Limoux Grizzlies coaches
Limoux Grizzlies players
Rugby league halfbacks
Wakefield Trinity players